Colored Memorial School and Risley High School is a historic school complex in Brunswick, Georgia where a Freedmen's School opened in 1870. It was added to the National Register of Historic Places on November 7, 2002. It is located at 1800 Albany Street.

Risley High School competed in the Georgia Interscholastic Association. It won the state championship in basketball in 1969.

Photos

See also
National Register of Historic Places listings in Glynn County, Georgia

References

External links

 * 

School buildings on the National Register of Historic Places in Georgia (U.S. state)
Brunswick, Georgia
Buildings and structures in Glynn County, Georgia
National Register of Historic Places in Glynn County, Georgia